The 1944 Cornell Big Red football team was an American football team that represented Cornell University as an independent during the 1944 college football season. In its ninth and final season under head coach Carl Snavely, the team compiled a 5–4 record and outscored its opponents 131 to 130. The team captains were Frank Accorsi and Grant Ellis. 

Cornell played its home games at Schoellkopf Field in Ithaca, New York.

Schedule

References

Cornell
Cornell Big Red football seasons
Cornell Big Red football